|}

The Kilbegnet Novice Chase is a Grade 3 National Hunt novice steeplechase in Ireland which is open to horses aged four years or older. 
It is run at Roscommon over a distance of about 2 miles and half a furlong (2 miles and 72 yards, or 3,284 metres), and it is scheduled to take place each year in late September or early October.

The race was awarded Grade 3 status in 2007.

Records
Leading jockey  (4 wins):
 Paul Carberry – Always (2004), 	Ballyagran (2006), Kalderon (2008), Save My Blushes (2010)

Leading trainer  (4 wins):
 Henry de Bromhead - Darwins Fox (2013), Ridestan (2016), Ornua (2018), Benruben (2020)

Winners since 1998

See also
 Horse racing in Ireland
 List of Irish National Hunt races

References
Racing Post
, 

National Hunt chases
National Hunt races in Ireland